NewsPim (Ko: 뉴스핌) or Newspim is a news and media company founded in April, 2003. The company has two economic newspapers, NewsPim and Anda, the latter of which was first published in July 2016. Its director is Byeongbok Min (Ko: 민 병복).

The company is one of the news sources for Factiva, and has signed a strategic alliance deal with Koscom.

See also 
 List of newspapers in South Korea

References 

Korean-language newspapers
Newspapers published in South Korea
Newspaper companies of South Korea
Publications established in 2003
Mass media in Seoul